is a Goemon game released for the Nintendo DS on June 23, 2005. Its release marked the revival of the series' medieval Japanese themes and quirky humor, as previous games had taken place in a futuristic setting or with a more serious tone.

Plot 
Disaster strikes when Goemon and Ebisumaru are sent to jail for crimes they didn't commit! After being freed from jail by their female companion Yae, they soon discover that poor-looking phonies are causing mischief under their names! You'll have to put a stop to these impostors to clear your name and save Edo from disaster.

References

External links
 
 Information about the game  in Hardcore Gaming 101

2005 video games
Nintendo DS games
Nintendo DS-only games
Japan-exclusive video games
Ganbare Goemon games
Video games developed in Japan

Single-player video games